A graduate diploma (GradD, GDip, GrDip, GradDip) is generally a qualification taken after completion of a first degree, although the level of study varies in different countries from being at the same level as the final year of a bachelor's degree to being at a level between a master's degree and a doctorate. In some countries the graduate diploma and postgraduate diploma are synonymous, while in others (particularly where the graduate diploma is at undergraduate degree level) the postgraduate diploma is a higher qualification.

Australia

The graduate diploma is normally taken following a bachelor's degree, and some master's degree programs have graduate diploma as a nested (interim) award. The qualification is at level 8 of the Australian Qualifications Framework, the same as an honours degree. This qualification is at the same level as the post graduate diploma qualifications awarded in New Zealand institutions and Australian graduate diplomas should not be confused with New Zealand graduate diplomas as they belong to two different qualification levels.

Canada

Graduate diplomas offered in Canada (French: Diplôme d'études supérieures spécialisées) are typically taken following a bachelor's degree and a successful award allows progression to a master's degree. Depending on the institution, a graduate diploma in Canada may be at graduate level or bachelor's level. Similar courses at other Canadian institutions may be termed postgraduate diplomas at graduate level and post-baccalaureate diploma at bachelor's level.

Denmark
In Denmark there are two forms of master's degree. The master's degree or candidatus is a FQ-EHEA second-cycle qualification worth 120 ECTS credits. These degrees are research-based and offered through universities (e.g. University of Copenhagen and Copenhagen Business School). The second form is the Graduate Diploma within the adult further education system, which is worth 60 ECTS credits and is taught part-time. The graduate diploma is normally taken following a bachelor's degree. Diplomas (in Danish: HD) are studied in business-related fields such as Business Administration and Innovation Management. Programs are normally split into Part 1 (graduate certificate) and Part 2 (graduate diploma), each being 60 ECTS Credits (one year of full-time-equivalent study).

India
In India the graduate diploma, comes one level before a master's degree–level qualification which are usually is a 1/2-year specialized programs. Certain institutes provide master's level programs with increased number lower credit courses for two years. At times for transnational equivalency the same is casually noted as graduate diplomas. Advanced diplomas provided are equivalent to a post-baccalaureate diploma; this is a one to three-year course.

Ireland

In the Republic of Ireland, the graduate diploma or post-graduate diploma is a level 9 award on the National Framework of Qualifications (NFQ) which is the same level as a masters degree. The higher diploma is an award at level 8, the same level as an honours bachelor's degree. These programmes generally consist of one year of full-time study and are usually taken after, and/or in a different subject from, an earlier bachelor's degree. A wide variety of courses are offered; it is also possible to progress to a master's degree.

The diploma is generally in two forms:
 A reorientation type qualification to reskill a graduate with new specialised skills, for instance the HDipStats - Higher Diploma in Statistics is aimed at offering additional skills in statistics. See also Higher Diploma.
 A professional type qualification which is necessary to enter a profession, for instance the HDipEd - Higher Diploma in Education allows a person to register and practice teaching. See also Postgraduate Diploma.

The graduate diploma (GradDip) is offered by University College Dublin, the Dublin Institute of Technology, Dublin City University, HETAC and the University of Limerick. The higher diploma (HDip) is offered by HETAC, NUI institutions, and Trinity College, Dublin.

Malaysia
The graduate diploma forms part of the lifelong education pathway on the Malaysian Qualifications Framework. They are qualifications at the level of a bachelor's degree but with half of the credit value.

New Zealand

In New Zealand, a graduate diploma is an advanced undergraduate qualification normally completed after a bachelor's degree or done at the same time as the bachelors study, and can be used as a bridging qualification to prove a student's ability to undertake postgraduate studies for a completely different field. A graduate diploma (e.g., Graduate Diploma in Education etc.) is different from a postgraduate diploma, which is a course of study at postgraduate level (e.g., Postgraduate Diploma in Clinical Psychology etc.). In universities and learning institutes, a graduate diploma is commonly studied by students who have already graduated in a different field and allows them to pursue a new profession. It mainly involves undertaking courses in an accelerated undergraduate level (e.g., normally a mixture of second and third year courses from the bachelor's degree) in order for the student to attain the requirements equivalent to a student who studied towards an undergraduate degree.

Singapore 

The graduate diploma is an academic or vocational qualification; as an academic qualification it is often taken after a bachelor's degree although sometimes only a foundation degree is required. It is usually awarded by a university or a graduate school and usually takes two terms of study to complete. It is also possible for academic graduate diploma holders to progress to a master's degree on an accelerated pathway compared to first embarking on a 3- or 4-year degree program. To ensure that the graduate diploma qualification is recognised, the awarding body must be registered with the Singapore Ministry of Education, like SUSS, NUS, JCU, SIPMM, etc.

The graduate diploma is generally a professional conversion qualification to reskill a graduate with new specialised skills, for instance the GDipPsy - Graduate Diploma in Psychology is aimed at offering specialised skills in psychology. See also postgraduate diploma.

The graduate diploma is offered at different levels by different institutions. The National University of Singapore requires study at master's level, but the graduate diplomas at the Singapore University of Social Sciences are UK (i.e. bachelor's-level) graduate diplomas awarded by the University of London and similarly the Ngee Ann - Adelaide Education Centre offers Australian graduate diplomas (i.e. Australian honours degree level) awarded by the University of Adelaide. The Graduate Diploma of Singapore Raffles Music College is a post-foundation degree qualification rather than post-bachelor's. Graduate diplomas from Aventis School of Management are part-time courses that is accredidated by The Association of Psychotherapists and Counsellors Singapore (APACS) or registered with European Foundation for Management Development and the European Council for Business Education (ECBE)

The WSQ Graduate Diploma is the highest qualification in Singapore's vocational Workforce Skills Qualifications framework, administered by the Singapore Workforce Development Agency. This is not tied to the levels of academic degrees.

United Kingdom 

In the UK, a graduate diploma is a short course, with a value of 80–120 UK credits (equivalent to 40–60 ECTS credits), that is normally studied by students who have already graduated in another field. Graduate diplomas are distinguished from graduate certificates by having a longer period of study, equivalent to two thirds of an academic year or more. Until the 1990s, the British conservatoires of music offered three year undergraduate courses to some of their students, leading the award of the Graduate Diploma, e.g. GRSM, GTCL, equivalent to a university first degree in music.  When a  number of conservatoires became affiliated to or constituent colleges of universities, the graduate diplomas were gradually replaced by the award of the BMus degree to all successful students.

A graduate diploma should not be confused with a postgraduate diploma, which is a master's degree-level qualification in the UK. Historically, this has not always been the case, with postgraduate diploma and graduate diploma used interchangeably, but the Quality Assurance Agency now makes a clear distinction between these titles. Some institutions have renamed courses as a result, e.g. The College of Law renamed the official title for its law conversion course from Postgraduate Diploma in Law to Graduate Diploma in Law as, although the law conversion course is studied postgraduately, the contents of the course are only undergraduate in nature.

In 2018, the Royal College of Art launched a new Graduate Diploma in Art and Design programme aimed at preparing graduate students for its master's degree programmes in Art and Design.

United States
In the US, graduate diplomas are "Intermediate Graduate Qualifications" involving study beyond master's level but not reaching doctoral level. They are generally found in professional, rather than academic, fields. Other qualifications at this level include advanced graduate certificates, specialist certificates and specialist degrees.

References

Education in Australia
Education in England
Education in Singapore
Education in the Republic of Ireland
Qualifications